John Joseph MacGowran (13 October 1918 – 30 January 1973) was an Irish actor, probably best known for his work with Samuel Beckett.

Stage career
MacGowran was born on 13 October 1918 in Dublin, and educated at Synge Street CBS. He established his professional reputation as a member of the Abbey Players in Dublin, while he achieved stage renown for his knowing interpretations of the works of Samuel Beckett. He appeared as Lucky in Waiting for Godot at the Royal Court Theatre, and with the Royal Shakespeare Company in Endgame at the Aldwych Theatre. He released an LP record titled MacGowran Speaking Beckett to coincide with Samuel Beckett's 60th birthday in 1966, and he won the 1970–71 Obie for Best Performance By an Actor in the off-Broadway play MacGowran in the Works of Beckett.

He also specialised in the work of Seán O'Casey, creating the role of Joxer in the Broadway musical Juno in 1959, based on Juno and the Paycock, O'Casey's 1924 play about the Irish Civil War. He played O'Casey's brother Archie in Young Cassidy (1965), one of John Ford's later films (which the director had to abandon due to ill health).

In 1954, he moved to London, where he became a member of the Royal Shakespeare Company, where he struck up a lasting friendship with actor Peter O'Toole, with whom he later appeared in Richard Brooks' Lord Jim (1965). He apparently had a fractious relationship with RSC director Peter Hall. He was Old Gobbo in The Merchant of Venice, and when the set arrived, Hall called all the cast into the theatre to view it. MacGowran was not there, still in his dressing room. An assistant was sent to fetch him. He returned alone: "Mr MacGowran says, Mr. Hall, that if you had read the play you would know that Old Gobbo was blind."

MacGowran played the title role of Gandhi in the Broadway play written by Gurney Campbell in 1971, directed by José Quintero.

Film career
MacGowran's film career started in Ireland with the film No Resting Place (1951), and many of his earlier films were set in Ireland. Notably The Quiet Man (1952), The Gentle Gunman (1952), Rooney (1958) and Darby O'Gill and the Little People (1959).

In 1966 Roman Polanski cast him as the gangster Albie in Cul-de-sac, before creating Professor Abronsius in The Fearless Vampire Killers (1967) especially for him. Other notable film appearances include the Ealing comedy The Titfield Thunderbolt (1953), Tony Richardson's Tom Jones (1963), David Lean's Doctor Zhivago (1965), Richard Lester's How I Won the War (1967), Peter Brook's King Lear, the leading role of Professor Collins in Wonderwall (1968), and Age of Consent (1969). On TV, he appeared in "The Happening", episode 5 of The Champions as Banner B. Banner, (Old prospector), and in The Winged Avenger episode of The Avengers. He played a safecracker opposite Kenneth Cope in "The Ghost Talks" episode of Randall and Hopkirk (Deceased). His last film was The Exorcist (1973), where he played Burke Dennings, an alcoholic director and Regan's first victim.

Personal life
In 1963, he married Aileen Gloria Nugent, daughter of Sir Walter Nugent, Bt. 

Shortly after completing work on The Exorcist, while in New York City appearing as Fluther in Seán O'Casey's The Plough and the Stars, MacGowran died at 54 from influenza after complications resulting from the London flu epidemic. He was survived by his wife and daughter.

Partial filmography

 No Resting Place (1951) – Billy Kyle
 The Quiet Man (1952) – Ignatius Feeney
 The Gentle Gunman (1952) – Patsy McGuire 
 Time Bomb (1953) – Bearded Man in Hostel (uncredited)
 The Titfield Thunderbolt (1953) –  Vernon Crump
 Raiders of the River (1956) – Alf Barber 
 Jacqueline (1956) – Campbell
 Sailor Beware! (1956) – Toddy (uncredited)
 The Rising of the Moon (1957) – Mickey J. – the poitín maker (1st Episode)
 Manuela (1957) – Tommy
 Rooney (1958) – Joe O'Connor
 She Didn't Say No! (1958) – William Bates
 Behemoth the Sea Monster (1959) – Dr. Sampson, the Paleontologist
 Darby O'Gill and the Little People (1959) – Phadrig Oge
 The Boy and the Bridge (1959) – Market Porter
 Blind Date (1959) – Postman
 Two and Two Make Six (1962) – Night Porter
 Captain Clegg (1962) – Frightened Man
 Mix Me a Person (1962) – Terence
 The Brain (1962) – Furber
 Tom Jones (1963) – Partridge
 The Ceremony (1963) – O'Brian
 Lord Jim (1965) – Robinson
 Young Cassidy (1965) – Archie
 Doctor Zhivago (1965) – Petya
 Cul-de-sac (1966) – Albie
 How I Won the War (1967) – Juniper
 The Fearless Vampire Killers (1967) – Professor Abronsius
 The Avengers TV Series: Episode "The Winged Avenger'" (1967) – Professor Poole
 Wonderwall (1968) – Prof. Oscar Collins
 Age of Consent (1969) – Nat Kelly
 Start the Revolution Without Me (1970) – Jacques
 The Yin and the Yang of Mr. Go (1970) – Leo Zimmerman 
 King Lear (1971) – Fool
 A Day at the Beach (1972) – The Collector
 The Exorcist (1973) – Burke Dennings (final film role)

References

External links

 
 

1918 births
1973 deaths
Irish male film actors
Irish male stage actors
Male actors from Dublin (city)
Deaths from influenza
People educated at Synge Street CBS
20th-century Irish male actors
Irish expatriates in the United Kingdom